The Indonesian national futsal team represents Indonesia in international futsal competitions. Indonesia has played fourteen times at the AFF Futsal Championship and nine times at the AFC Futsal Asian Cup. The team never participates in any World Cup but has won the AFF Futsal Championship only once in 2010.

History
The history of futsal has been around for a long time in Indonesia. The journey of futsal started in 1998-1999, But it was in 2002 that futsal was officially recognized in Indonesia when this country was asked to host the AFC final round of futsal championships in Jakarta by the AFC.

Although relatively new, this sport is quite often found in various regions. This can be seen from the number of futsal fields that have been built in many cities.

The first futsal League competition in Indonesia was held in 2006 and called the Indonesia Futsal League (IFL) and the Liga Futsal Wanita Indonesia (LFWI) was held in 2012. But in 2015, IFL changed its name to Indonesia Pro Futsal League (PFL) and LFWI changed the name to Women's Pro Futsal League (WPFL).

There are several names that have contributed to the development of futsal in Indonesia. Names such as Wandy Batangtaris, a member of the FIFA Futsal Committee and the Ronny Pattinasarani are mentioned as pioneers and developers of futsal in Indonesia. And there is another one who is very serious about advancing futsal, namely Hary Tanoesoedibjo.

Tournament records

FIFA Futsal World Cup

AFC Futsal Asian Cup

Asian Indoor and Martial Arts Games

AFF Futsal Championship

Southeast Asian Games

*Denotes draws include knockout matches decided on penalty kicks.
**Red border color indicates tournament was held on home soil.

Players

Current squad 
The following players were selected for the 2022 AFC Futsal Asian Cup.

Notable players 
 Viernes Ricardo Polnaya
 Socrates "Caca" Matulessy
 Sayan Karmadi
 Denny Handoyo
 Ade Lesmana
 Yos Adi Wicaksono
 Jaelani Ladjanibi
 Vennard Hutabarat
 Andri Irawan
 David Sugianto

Results

Recent results within last 12 months and upcoming fixtures.
Legend

2022

Coaches list

All-time records

Honours

Regional 
 AFF Futsal Championship
 Champions (1): 2010
 Runners-up: 2006, 2008, 2019, 2022
 Third place: 2003, 2005, 2009, 2012,  2018
 Fourth place: 2013, 2014
 Southeast Asian Games
 Silver medal: 2021
 Bronze medal: 2007, 2011, 2013
 Fourth place: 2017
 AFC Futsal Asian Cup
 Quarter-Final: 2022

See also
 Indonesia national under-20 futsal team
 Indonesia women's national futsal team
 Indonesia national football team
 Indonesia national beach soccer team

References

External links
 AFF Futsal Championship on RSSSF

National sports teams of Indonesia
Asian national futsal teams
National